Porter Kunjali is a 1965 Indian Malayalam-language film,  directed and produced by P. A. Thomas. The film stars Prem Nazir, Sheela, Adoor Bhasi and Muthukulam Raghavan Pillai. The film's score was composed by M. S. Baburaj.

Cast

Prem Nazir as Doctor Sali
Sheela as Aamina
Adoor Bhasi as Mollakka
Muthukulam Raghavan Pillai as Keshavan Pilla
O. Ramdas
T. R. Omana AS Kunjipathumma
P. A. Thomas as Kochuraman
T. S. Muthaiah AS Kunjali
Annie as Dr. Banumathi
Bahadoor AS Pareed
 Meena as Vanithasamajam Member
Panjabi
 V.S. Achari
 Geetha as Janamma
 Chandni as Madavi
Suprabha
Thankam

Soundtrack
The music was composed by M. S. Baburaj with lyrics by Abhayadev and Sreemoolanagaram Vijayan.

References

External links
 

1965 films
1960s Malayalam-language films
Films directed by P. A. Thomas